Security Bank is a U.S. financial services institution headquartered in New Auburn, Wisconsin.

History
Founded in 1907, Security Bank is a full-service community bank that is one of the oldest banks in Chippewa County, Wisconsin. Security Bank provides bank branch offices at five Wisconsin locations: New Auburn, Bloomer Sand Creek, Ridgeland and Dallas.

As of March 2009, the bank reported US$75,658,000 in assets.

FDIC Charter Information
Security Bank has been FDIC insured since January 1, 1934 with certificate #10015.  Federal Reserve ID# 20053

References

External links
Security Bank
Security State Bank

Banks based in Wisconsin
Chippewa County, Wisconsin